The Gymnastics competition in the 2007 Summer Universiade were held in Bangkok, Thailand.

Artistic gymnastics

Men's events

Women's events

Rhythmic gymnastics

References

External sources
 Gymnastics World Stars at the UNIVERSIADE 2007 - Total Triumph of Anna BESSONOVA
 24th Universiade Bangkok 2007 Artistic Gymnastics Women Bangkok (THA) 2007 August 9-12 Finals Women

Summer Universiade
2007 Summer Universiade
2007